The Gasteruptiidae are one of the more distinctive families among the apocritan wasps, with surprisingly little variation in appearance for a group that contains around 500 species in two subfamilies (Gasteruptiinae and Hyptiogastrinae) and with 6 genera worldwide. They are members of Evanioidea.

Genera 
This family includes the following genera in two subfamilies:
 Gasteruptiinae Ashmead, 1900
 Gasteruption Latreille, 1777
 Plutofoenus Kieffer, 1911
 Spinolafoenus Macedo, 2009
 Trilobitofoenus Macedo, 2009
 Hyptiogastrinae
 Hyptiogaster Kieffer, 1903
 Pseudofoenus Kieffer, 1902
Several fossil species are also known:

Hypselogastriinae
Hypselogastrion Engel & Wang, 2016 Burmese amber, Myanmar, mid Cretaceous (latest Albian - earliest Cenomanian)
Kotujellitinae
†Kotujellites Rasnitsyn 1990 Taimyr amber, Russia Late Cretaceous (Cenomanian)
†Kotujisca Rasnitsyn 1991 Andaikhudag Formation, Mongolia, Early Cretaceous (Hauterivian-Barremian)

Description
The propleura form an elongated "neck", the petiole is attached very high on the propodeum, and the hind tibiae are swollen and club-like. The females commonly have a long ovipositor (except in the genus Pseudofoenus), and lay eggs in the nests of solitary bees and wasps, where their larvae prey upon the host eggs, larvae and provisions. 

The absence of "teeth" on the crown of the head and the somewhat thickened antennae readily separate these wasps from those in the unrelated family Stephanidae, which also contains very slender wasps with long necks.

Distribution
The smaller of the two gasteruptiid subfamilies, Hyptiogastrinae, has a restricted Gondwanan distribution. Hyptiogaster with 10 species is endemic to Australia, whereas of the 80 species of Pseudofoenus, most are found in Australia, with 2 species in New Zealand, 2 species in South America, 5 species in New Guinea and New Britain, and 3 species in the south-west Pacific (New Caledonia, New Guinea, Fiji and Vanuatu).

Gasteruption is worldwide in its distribution, whereas Plutofoenus, Spinolafoenus and Trilobitofoenus are found in South America.

References

External links

Gasteruption sp. Diagnostic photos of male and female imagines.
Gasteruptiidae Tree of Life, extensive article.
Bugguide.net. Information and images
Encyclopedia of Life

Evanioidea